Boss Shoutin' is an album by saxophonist Willis Jackson which was recorded in 1964 and released on the Prestige label.

Reception

Allmusic awarded the album 4 stars stating "Boss Shoutin' is well worth obtaining if you prefer your jazz on the funky side".

Track listing 
All compositions by Willis Jackson except where noted.
 "St. Louis Blues" (W. C. Handy) – 8:24  
 "Que Sera, Sweetie" – 7:01  
 "Shoutin'" – 6:45  
 "Nice 'n' Easy" (Alan and Marilyn Bergman, Lew Spence) – 6:38  
 "Your Wonderful Love" (Dorothy Fields, Richard Rodgers) – 5:57

Personnel 
Willis Jackson – tenor saxophone
Frank Robinson – trumpet
Carl Wilson – organ
Pat Martino – guitar
George Tucker – bass
Joe Hadrick  – drums

References 

Willis Jackson (saxophonist) albums
1964 albums
Prestige Records albums
Albums recorded at Van Gelder Studio
Albums produced by Ozzie Cadena